Fabian Bösch (born 6 July 1997) is a Swiss freestyle skier.

He has won gold medals at both Winter X Games and World Championships. Fabian represented Switzerland in slopestyle at the 2014 Winter Olympics in Sochi and 2018 Winter Olympics in PyeongChang. He participated at the FIS Freestyle Ski and Snowboarding World Championships 2019, winning the gold medal in big air.

References

External links
 
 
 
 

1997 births
Living people
Freestyle skiers at the 2014 Winter Olympics
Freestyle skiers at the 2018 Winter Olympics
Freestyle skiers at the 2022 Winter Olympics
Swiss male freestyle skiers
Olympic freestyle skiers of Switzerland
X Games athletes
21st-century Swiss people